Hiroshima is a 1995 Japanese-Canadian war drama film directed by Koreyoshi Kurahara and Roger Spottiswoode about the decision-making processes that led to the dropping of the atomic bombs by the United States on the Japanese cities of Hiroshima and Nagasaki toward the end of World War II. The three-hour film was made for television (Showtime Network) and had no theatrical release.

A combination of dramatization, historical footage, and eyewitness interviews, the film alternates between documentary footage and dramatic recreations. The dramatizations and most of the original footage are presented as sepia-toned images, serving to blur the distinction between them. The languages are English and Japanese, with subtitles, and the actors are largely Canadian and Japanese.

Synopsis
The film opens on 12 April 1945 with the death of Franklin Roosevelt and the succession of Harry Truman to the presidency. In Europe, the Germans are close to surrender, but in the Pacific the bloody battle for Okinawa is still under way. American casualties have almost reached 900,000, with Japanese casualties at 1.1 million; 8 million Asian civilians have died in the war that began with Japan's 1931 invasion of Manchuria.

The new president knows nothing about the nuclear weapons being developed at Los Alamos, and he must decide on whether to use them and how. When nuclear physicist Leo Szilard delivers a petition signed by 73 scientists urging the president not to deploy the bomb, U.S. Secretary of State James F. Byrnes tells him: "You do not spend two billion dollars and then show them [American voters] nothing." Also urging deployment is Maj. Gen. Leslie Groves, director of the Manhattan Project. The Interim Committee appointed by Truman recommends unanimously that he use the bomb on "war plants surrounded by worker housing", without warning. General George Marshall lays out plans for the invasion of Kyūshū in November and Honshū in March 1946. 

In Japan, Minister of War General Anami Korechika argues that the homeland must be defended. The voice of reason is the new civilian prime minister, Kantarō Suzuki. In Tokyo, Admiral Yonai Mitsumasa assures the cabinet of victory. 

On July 16, the Trinity test shows that a plutonium bomb (Fat Man) is feasible and that a nuclear blast is even more powerful than scientists predicted. The uranium bomb (Little Boy, which is untested but is expected to work) leaves Los Alamos for Tinian island in the Pacific. At the Potsdam conference, Joseph Stalin promises to join the war against Japan. Winston Churchill urges Truman to use the bomb to constrain Russian expansion. The Allied leaders deliver an ultimatum to Japan "to give them one last chance."

Truman strikes Kyoto off the target list, leaving Hiroshima as the primary target. The Enola Gay makes the drop on the morning of August 6, 1945. On August 9, the Soviet Union invades Manchuria and the Fat Man plutonium bomb devastates Nagasaki. Hirohito finally intervenes, telling the cabinet that Japan "must endure the unendurable" and surrender. Young army officers urge Genrtsl Anami to join them in a military coup, but he tells them: "The emperor has spoken; we must obey him." On August 15, the emperor's surrender message is broadcast to Japan, and Anami commits ritual suicide.

Reception
Though not widely reviewed, Hiroshima was praised online: "Fascinating, and surprisingly ambivalent, docudrama rehashes familiar terrain with remarkable freshness precisely because of the emphasis on the politicians (rather than on the scientists), the bi-national approach, and an odd mixing of dramatization, newsreel footage, and even a few talking-head interviews with people who were there."

Awards
12th Gemini Awards, Toronto: Best Dramatic TV Movie or Mini-Series, 1998
12th Gemini Awards, Toronto: Best Direction in a Dramatic Program or Mini-Series, Roger Spottiswoode, 1998
12th Gemini Awards, Toronto: Best Performance by an Actor in a Leading Role in a Dramatic Program or Mini-Series, Kenneth Welsh, 1998
 Humanitas Prize, USA: Writing Award, PBS/Cable Television, to John Hopkins & Toshiro Ishido 1997
 48th Primetime Emmy Awards, Los Angeles: Nominee: Outstanding Miniseries, 1996

Cast

See also
 Atomic bombings of Hiroshima and Nagasaki
 Surrender of Japan
List of historical drama films
List of historical drama films of Asia

References

External links
 
 
 Hiroshima review, Variety, 4 August 1995 at Internet Archive.

1995 films
Canadian World War II films
English-language Canadian films
1990s English-language films
1990s Japanese-language films
Films about the atomic bombings of Hiroshima and Nagasaki
Films directed by Koreyoshi Kurahara
Films directed by Roger Spottiswoode
Science docudramas
Films with screenplays by John Hopkins
Films produced by Kazutoshi Wadakura
Cultural depictions of Harry S. Truman
Cultural depictions of Hirohito
Gemini and Canadian Screen Award for Best Television Film or Miniseries winners
Japan in non-Japanese culture
Japanese World War II films
Canadian docudrama films
Canadian war drama films
Japanese war drama films
1990s Canadian films